Project 6 (PSGC: 137404084) is a barangay of the 1st legislative district of Quezon City, Metro Manila, Philippines. Project 6 is mainly a residential area with neighboring barangays having high-rise buildings like TriNoma, Ayala Malls Vertis North, Word of Hope Christian Family Church Main, and SM City North EDSA. Almost half of Project 6's land are attributed to Veterans Memorial Golf Course, located in the southern half of Project 6 where Veterans Memorial Medical Center could be found as well.

Neighboring barangays include Vasra, Bagong Pag-asa, and Bahay Toro.

Barangay and Sangguniang Kabataan officials

Members of Sangguniang Barangay 

The incumbent Barangay and SK Councils were elected in the 2018 Philippine barangay and Sangguniang Kabataan elections on May 14, 2018.

Demographics 
In the 2015 Philippine Housing and Population Census, Project 6 ranked 50th in Quezon City with a total population of 15,255.

References

External links 

 
 
Sangguniang Kabataan Project 6

Quezon City
Barangays of Quezon City
Barangays of Metro Manila